Remontado, also known in literature as Sinauna, Kabalat, Remontado Dumagat, and more commonly by the autonym Hatang Kayi, is a Malayo-Polynesian language spoken in Tanay, Rizal, General Nakar, Quezon (including in Paimahuan, Limoutan), Rodriguez, Rizal and Antipolo, in the Philippines. It is one of the Philippine Negrito languages. It is a moribund language.

Terminology
The language is referred to by various terms in linguistic literature. (meaning 'ancient' or 'old' in Tagalog) is a term used in some literature that originates after the language's discovery in the 1970s but has never been used by the speakers of the language themselves. Remontado Agta has also been used but this is also erroneous as speakers of this language are never referred to as Agta.

Classification
Reid (2010) classifies the language as a Central Luzon language.

Distribution
The Remontado Dumagat were traditionally found in the mountains around the boundary between Sampaloc district in Tanay, Rizal, and General Nakar, Quezon (Lobel 2013:72-73).

Today, Remontado is spoken in the following five villages, where it is only spoken by elderly people over the age of 50 (Lobel & Surbano 2019). Two of the villages are in Barangay Santa Inez, Tanay town, Rizal Province, and three of the villages are in Barangay Limutan, General Nakar town, Quezon Province.
Minanga (Sentro), Barangay Limutan, General Nakar town, Quezon Province
Sitio Sari, Barangay Limutan, General Nakar town, Quezon Province
Sitio Paimuhuan, Barangay Limutan, General Nakar town, Quezon Province
Sitio Nayon, Barangay Santa Inez, Tanay town, Rizal Province
Sitio Kinabuan, Barangay Santa Inez, Tanay town, Rizal Province

References

Aeta languages
Central Luzon
Endangered Austronesian languages
Languages of Rizal
Languages of Quezon